Adiantum myriosorum is a fern species very similar to Adiantum pedatum. It was once included in that species but now is recognized as being genetically distinct. It is native to Asia, from central China to northern India.

References

External links
Flora of China (eflora): 

myriosorum
Ferns of India